Uncertain Tax Position refers to the uncertainties involving tax items claimed or intended to be claimed on an income tax return with a taxing authority. Companies will often take less than certain positions regarding the amount of tax expense they have to pay and/or the amount of tax benefit they are receiving. These uncertain tax positions may be the result of unclear tax law or uncertainties regarding their own circumstances.

Because of the difference in treating the uncertainties, the Financial Accounting Standards Board (FASB) issued in 2006 Interpretation No. (FIN) 48, “Accounting for Uncertainty in Income Taxes” to standardize the accounting for uncertain tax positions (now covered in FASB ASC 740).

References

 

Accounting in the United States
Taxation in the United States
Accounting terminology
Tax accounting